Tamar Frankel (born July 4, 1925 in Tel Aviv) has been a professor of law at Boston University School of Law since 1968.  She is the author of The Ponzi Scheme Puzzle: A History and Analysis of Con Artists and Victims, Fiduciary Law, Trust and Honesty: America’s Business Culture at a Crossroad, Investment Management Regulation,  Securitization, and The Regulation of Money Managers. Her areas of scholarship include financial system regulation, fiduciary law, corporate governance, the Internet, and Space Law.  A native of Israel, she has taught at Oxford University, Tokyo University, and lectured in Geneva and Kuala Lumpur, Malaysia, and has consulted with the People's Bank of China. She has been a Faculty Fellow at the Berkman Center for Internet and Society, and was a guest scholar at the Brookings Institution in Washington, D.C.

In 1998, Professor Frankel was instrumental in the establishment and corporate structure of the Internet Corporation for Names and Numbers (ICANN).

Professor Frankel is a frequent contributor to the Justia Verdict blog

References

Living people
Boston University School of Law faculty
1925 births
Israeli expatriates in the United States